Schoenus ericetorum, known as heath bog-rush, is a species of sedge native to eastern Australia. A tufted perennial grass-like plant growing to 40 cm tall. Often seen in heath and dry eucalyptus forest on sandy soils. This is one of the many plants first published by Robert Brown with the type known as "(J.) v.v." It appears in his Prodromus Florae Novae Hollandiae et Insulae Van Diemen in 1810.

References 

ericetorum
Plants described in 1810
Flora of New South Wales
Flora of Victoria (Australia)
Flora of Queensland